Branimir Ivan Sikic is an American medical doctor and scientist at Stanford University School of Medicine. He is an oncologist and cancer pharmacologist, and has served as a faculty member at Stanford University since 1979. His research spans basic, translational, and clinical research and investigates the mechanisms of drug resistance and the development of new anticancer therapies.

Early life
Sikic was born in Graz, Austria, on October 18, 1947. His parents were refugees from Croatia, his father a mathematician and his mother a linguist. The family emigrated to Adelaide, Australia in 1949, and to Cincinnati, Ohio in 1956. Sikic graduated from St. Xavier High School as president of his class in 1964 at age 16, and attended Georgetown University in Washington, D.C., where he obtained a B.S. degree in biology in 1968.

Education and training
Sikic attended the University of Chicago Pritzker School of Medicine, graduating with an M.D. in 1972. He returned to Georgetown University Hospital in Washington, D.C. for an internship and residency in internal medicine (1972-5). From 1975 to 1978 he was a postdoctoral laboratory research fellow at the National Institutes of Health (NIH), working on the regulation of drug metabolism and the pharmacology and pulmonary toxicology of the anticancer drug bleomycin. He returned to Georgetown in 1978–9 to complete a clinical fellowship in medical oncology, prior to joining the faculty at Stanford University.

Honors and awards
In 1992 Sikic began directing the General Clinical Research Center and then the Center for Clinical and Translational Research in 2008. He is the founder and director of the Central European Oncology Congress held in Opatija, Croatia since 1998. In 2010 he was awarded the Katarina Zrinska Medal for Science and Medicine by the President of Croatia.

Contributions to science

Mechanisms and regulation of multidrug resistance
Sikic has made significant contributions to understanding the biology and clinical significance of multidrug resistance (MDR), particularly the P-glycoprotein (P-gp) multidrug transporter and regulation of the ABCB1 gene. He discovered that deletion of aa335 changes the drug-binding spectrum and is integral to the pharmacophore of P-gp. He also defined specific sites of transactivation of ABCB1, and mechanisms of amplification of the gene.

Clinical trials of modulation of multidrug resistance
The laboratory work on drug resistance mechanisms led to a series of clinical Phase I-III trials that defined this field. Early on, Sikic's group found that P-gp inhibition resulted in significant pharmacokinetic alterations of several anticancer drugs, with the potential for markedly increased toxicities unless doses were adjusted. These findings, and the co-existence of other resistance mechanisms in human cancers, redefined the field and demonstrated the limited clinical utility of MDR modulation.

Cancer genomics
The Sikic group utilized gene expression profiling and systems biology to yield insight into cancer taxonomy and prognostic and predictive signatures for cancer therapies. With their colleagues Olivier Gevaert and Sylvia Plevritis, they have identified driver genes for ovarian cancers.

See also
 SPECTRUM: Clinical & Translational Research Unit
 Cancer Molecular Therapeutics Research Association (CMTRA)

References

1947 births
Living people
American oncologists
American pharmacologists
Physicians from Ohio
Austrian emigrants to the United States
Georgetown College (Georgetown University) alumni
Stanford University School of Medicine faculty
St. Xavier High School (Ohio) alumni